Video Violence, also known as Video Violence... When Renting is Not Enough, is a 1987 American horror film directed by Gary Cohen and starring Gary Schwartz and Chick Kaplan. The film was shot entirely on a VHS camcorder.

Cast 

 Gary Schwartz as 1st Store Owner 
 Chick Kaplan as 2nd Store Owner
 Robin Leeds as Customer
 Paige Price as 1st Victim
 Kevin Haver as Rick Carlson
 Art Neill as Steven Emory
 Bill Biach as 1st Yokel
 Uke as Eli
 Bart Sumner as Howard
 Joseph Kordos as Reggie Hobbs
 Chris Williams as Desk Sergeant 
 William Toddie as Chief of Police
 Jackie Neill as Rachel Emory
 Ricky Kotch as Young Boy
 Jennifer Biach as Dog
 Bonnie Schedin as Young Actress
 Madison Schedin as Baby
 Judy Seplowin as Lori Edwards
 Karen Oujo as 2nd Yokel

 Linda Herman as Mrs. Carlson
 Cara Biach as Secretary 
 Joann Poll as Telephone Operator
 O. Selig Stokes as Fraud Hobbs
 Susan Speidel as 3rd Yokel
 Marci Garfinkel as 4th Yokel
 Jerry Kopf as Man in Jeep
 Christa Somma as 1st Girl in Jeep
 Susan Stern as 2nd Girl in Jeep
 Mike Yonone as Patrolman
 Barbara Brunnquell as Old Lady
 Bob Brunnquell as Deli Owner 
 Richard 'Dick' Haig as Deli Assistant 
 Ray Clark as Home Owner
 Ellen Dreyer as Legless Girl
 Lori Andres as 5th Yokel
 David Christopher as Vampire
 Richard Johnson as Young Man
 Lisa Cohen as Joanna Barker

Production

Writer and director Gary Cohen came up with the idea for the film while working as a video store clerk. A fan of the Golden Age of Hollywood, he was disheartened by the fact that horror films, particularly slashers, were the most popular films among his clientele. The idea for the film came about one afternoon when a young mother with her children asked if the film I Dismember Mama contained any sex. Cohen informed her that he was unsure about the film's sexual content but that he knew it contained graphic violence. The woman decided to rent the film, telling Cohen that as long as the film were devoid of sex, she considered it appropriate viewing for her children. The same exchange occurs in Video Violence, concerning the film Blood Cult.

Cohen had initially secured the use of a local access television station to edit the film over the course of two six-hour shifts. When the station owner found out that Cohen was editing a horror film, he reneged on the agreement and only permitted Cohen the use of the station for two hours during the second shift. After the film's editing was complete, Cohen shopped it around to multiple distributors, only two of which responded. Cohen sold the rights to Camp Video because they were the only ones to offer to design video box art.

Cohen has claimed that the film had a budget of $6.

Release
Video Violence was first released in 1987 and per Brian Albright, was "one of the most widely distributed SOV horror films of the era". The movie's video jacket featured an endorsement from the parody religious group, the Church of the SubGenius, and the claim that Camp Video released "more movies by low-budget auteur Ray Dennis Steckler than anyone else in the world."

In 2007, Camp Motion Pictures released the film on special edition DVD including the sequel Video Violence 2.
Cohen also directed a sequel: Video Violence 2 as well as Captives, shot between the two VV films.  All three have since been re-released by Camp Video as part of their Basement collection. Video Violence has been screened several times at Alamo Drafthouse Cinema locations as part of film festivals and retrospectives such as the 2018 film festival VHStival in Raleigh and the "Killer Tapes and Shattered Screens" series in Yonkers.

In 2013 Cohen screened Video Violence: Redux Deluxe, a mashup of the first two films, at the Cinedelphia Film Festival.

In 2022, boutique label TerrorVision  released Video Violence on a Blu Ray 2 pack with the sequel.

Soundtrack 
The film score for Video Violence was released in 2020 through Graveface Records's Terror Vision imprint. The label also held a limited screening of the film in October of the same year.

Reception 
Bleeding Skull reviewed the film in 2018, stating that it "should be admired for its prominence in SOV history, rather than its actual entertainment value." A reviewer for DVD Talk was highly critical, writing "a big, fat, hairy, parasite-infested and pus laden set of sores on anyone who believed that this pair of productions had any meaningful motion picture merit whatsoever". The Oklahoma Gazette reviewed both Video Violence 1 and 2 as part of a set released by Camp Motion Pictures, noting that the first film "takes itself seriously, whereas Video Violence 2 somehow realized there was a joke at stake, and it was past time to get into it."

Cohen has referred to Video Violence as "a piece of wonderful, campy trash".

References

External links

1987 horror films
1987 films
Camcorder films
American independent films
American horror films
Films about snuff films
1980s English-language films
1980s American films